Amaravati is the legislative capital and the de facto seat of government of the Indian state of Andhra Pradesh.

Amaravati, Amaravathi or Amravati may also refer to:

Religion 
 Amaravati, a Pali word meaning "Abode of the Deathless", which refers to nirvana
 Amaravati Stupa, Ruined Buddhist stupa near the village of Amaravathi
Amaravati style or school, regional style of sculpture, 1st century BC to 4th century CE, after the stupa
 Amaravati (mythology), the capital of Svarga, one of the seven planes of Hinduism
 Amaravathi mandal, Andhra Pradesh, a mandal in Guntur district headquartered at Amaravathi
 Amaravati Buddhist Monastery, a Theravada Buddhist monastery located near London, UK

Geography 
 Amaravathi (village), Palnadu district in Andhra Pradesh, modern village near the stupa
 Amravati, a city in the state of Maharashtra, India
 Amravati district, a district of Maharashtra state
 Amaravathinagar, a town in Tamil Nadu state
 Amaravathi Reservoir, the Amaravathi Dam impoundment on the edge of Indira Gandhi Wildlife Sanctuary
 Amaravati River, a river in the states of Kerala and Tamil Nadu, India
 Amaravati, principality in the ancient kingdom of Champa in Central Vietnam

Railways 
 Amravati railway station, in Maharashtra, India
 Amaravati Express, express train operated by Indian Railways

Entertainment 
 Amaravathi (1993 film), a 1993 Tamil language film
 Amaravathi (2009 film), a Telugu language film